Herbert Flam (November 7, 1928 – November 25, 1980) was an American tennis player who, in 195,7 was ranked by Lance Tingay as the World No. 4 amateur (and World No. 5 by Adrian Quist).

Biography
Flam was born in New York City, and was Jewish. He reached his first Grand Slam final at the U.S. championships in 1950, beating Bill Talbert and Gardnar Mulloy before losing to Art Larsen. That year he was ranked Number 2 in the United States.

In 1951 he won the Ojai Tennis Tournament in men's singles. At Wimbledon 1951 Flam beat Frank Sedgman before losing to Dick Savitt in the semifinals. That year he was ranked Number 4 in the US.

In 1952 at Wimbledon, Flam beat Mulloy and Vic Seixas before losing in the semis to Jaroslav Drobny. That year he was ranked Number 5 in the US. In the 1956 Australian Championships, Flam beat Ashley Cooper before losing in the semifinals to Ken Rosewall. 
In September 1956 Flam won the singles title at the Pacific Southwest Championships, defeating Rosewall in the final in five sets. That year he was ranked Number 2 in the US.

At the 1957 French championships Flam beat Mervyn Rose in a five-set semifinal before losing in straight sets to Sven Davidson in the final. At the U. S. championships, Flam beat Seixas before losing to Cooper in the semi finals. That year he was ranked Number 2 in the US, behind Seixas.

Flam was inducted into the International Tennis Association Collegiate Tennis Hall of Fame in 1987, into the Southern California Jewish Sports Hall of Fame in 1990, into the International Jewish Sports Hall of Fame in 1992, and into the University of California at Los Angeles Hall of Fame in 2006. In 2017, he was inducted into the Southern California Tennis Association Hall of Fame.

Grand Slam finals

Singles (twice runner-up)

See also
List of select Jewish tennis players

References

External links
 
 
 
 Jews in Sports bio
 Jewish Sports Hall of Fame

1928 births
1980 deaths
American male tennis players
Jewish tennis players
Jewish American sportspeople
Sportspeople from New York City
Tennis people from New York (state)
UCLA Bruins men's tennis players
Beverly Hills High School alumni
20th-century American Jews